Gandhinagar is a locality in Guwahati. Located in east of the city, it is sparsely populated. It is surrounded by the localities of Satgaon and Narengi.

See also
 Narengi
 Satgaon

References

Neighbourhoods in Guwahati